The CARE Principles for Indigenous Data Governance were created to advance the legal principles underlying collective and individual data rights in the context of the United Nations Declaration on the Rights of Indigenous Peoples (UNDRIP). CARE was created by the International Indigenous Data Sovereignty Interest Group, a group that is a part of the Research Data Alliance.

CARE is an acronym which stands for Collective Benefit, Authority to Control, Responsibility, Ethics.

While CARE can be considered part of the open data movement, it aims to build on other standards such as FAIR (findable, accessible, interoperable, reusable) by considering power differentials and historical contexts. The CARE Principles for Indigenous Data Governance are 'people and purpose-oriented, reflecting the crucial role of data in advancing Indigenous innovation and self-determination'.

The CARE principles have been embedded into the Beta version of Standardised Data on Initiatives (STARDIT).

See also 

 FAIR data
 Data sovereignty

References

External links 

 CARE Principles for Indigenous Data Governance (including links to PDFs of full description and short summaries)

Data management
Indigenous rights
Canadian federal legislation
Indigenous politics in Canada
Truth and Reconciliation Commission of Canada